Sayeed Ahmed (1 January 1931 – 21 January 2010) was a Bangladeshi dramatist, playwright, writer and sitar player. He was awarded Bangla Academy Literary Award in 1974 and Ekushey Padak in 2010 by the Government of Bangladesh.

Background
Ahmed was born on 1 January 1931 at Islampur in Old Dhaka in the-then Bengal Presidency in British India. His mother was Jamila Khatun. His father, Mirza F Mohammad, was the owner of a commercial theatre, Lion Theatre, at Islampur. Ahmed had three elder brothers – Nasir Ahmed, radio personality and journalist Nazir Ahmed and painter Hamidur Rahman. Ahmed studied at Dhaka Collegiate School. He completed his bachelor's in international studies from the University of Dhaka. He later studied for his master's at the London School of Economics in 1954. In 1956, Ahmed moved back to Lahore and joined the public service.

Career
Ahmed, along with Shamsur Rahman and Hasan Hafizur Rahman, compose and wrote radio plays in the early 1950s. He played sitar in BBC and acted on stage in London and New York. He was the sitarist during the Europe tour of Uday Shankar.

Ahmed served as the secretary of Ministry of Youth and Sports and the director general of Bangladesh Television. He served as guest lecturer in Georgetown University, and other academies in Brazil, China, France, Germany, The Netherlands, India, Japan, Malaysia and Russia.

Personal life
Ahmed was married to Parvin Ahmed. He had two brothers - journalist Nazir Ahmed and sculptor Hamidur Rahman.

Works
 Kalbela (originally written as The Thing in English; 1962)
 Milepost (1965)
 Trishnay (1968)
 Ek Din Protidin (1974) 
 Shesh Nawab (1988)

Ahmed's plays was translated into French, German, Italian, Urdu and Punjabi and were staged by different troupes in Bangladesh, India, Pakistan and United States. He created "Bishwa Natok", a program in Bangladesh Television, where he introduced and directed plays of international fame.

Awards
 Bangla Academy Literary Award (1974)
 Legion of Honour from the French Government (1993)
 Shilpakala Academy Award (2007)
 Ekushey Padak (2010)

References

1931 births
2010 deaths
University of Dhaka alumni
Sitar players
Writers from Dhaka
Bangladeshi dramatists and playwrights
Recipients of Bangla Academy Award
Recipients of the Ekushey Padak